Sisyphus longipes, is a species of dung beetle found in India, Sri Lanka, Nepal, Myanmar and Thailand.

Description
This broadly oval, highly convex species has an average length of about 4 to 6.5 mm. Body black with shiny dorsum and ventrum. Body covered with a very minute and erect reddish setae. A small bare patch upon each side of the anterior part without any setae. Posterior legs are extremely long and slender. Head moderately strongly punctured. Clypeus almost semicircular emarginate in front. There are two sharp teeth which are closely separated in the clypeus. Pronotum finely punctured. Elytra finely striate, with flat intervals. Pygidium narrow and covered with large, shallow roundish pits.

References 

Scarabaeinae
Insects of Sri Lanka
Insects of India
Insects described in 1789